Hapalopilus albocitrinus is a species of polypore fungus. Found in South Asia and Africa, it was first described in 1922 by Thomas Petch as a species of Poria. Leif Ryvarden transferred it to the genus Hapalopilus in 1980.

References

Polyporaceae
Fungi described in 1922
Fungi of Africa
Fungi of Asia
Taxa named by Thomas Petch